Ma Jiantang (born April 29, 1958) is a Chinese economist and politician. He was director of the National Bureau of Statistics from 2008 to 2015, executive vice-president of Academy of Governance (minister-level rank) from 2015 to 2018, and party branch secretary of Development Research Center of the State Council from 2018 to 2022.

Life and career
Born in Binzhou, Shandong, Ma graduated from the Department of Economics of Shandong University in 1982, and earned a master's degree at Nankai University in 1985. He received his doctorate from the Chinese Academy of Social Sciences in 1988. Ma won the Sun Yefang Economics Prize in 1994 while serving on the Development Research Center of the State Council, he received the Chinese Economic Theory Innovation award In 2012.

He served as the Director of General Department, SETC from 1996 to 2003, and was Deputy Secretary of SASAC from 2003 to 2008. From 2004 to 2007, he was vice governor of Qinghai, a province located in northwest China. He served as the Director of China NBS from 2008 to 2014.

Ma was elected to the 18th Central Committee of the Communist Party of China as an alternate member in November 2012. Ma was ranked first out of 168 alternate members in a list ordered by the number of votes received at the party congress.  Ma was made a full member of the committee at the 3rd Plenum of the 18th Central committee in 2014 to replace a vacant seat.

References

1958 births
Living people
Politicians from Binzhou
People's Republic of China economists
Members of the 18th Central Committee of the Chinese Communist Party
Economists from Shandong
People's Republic of China politicians from Shandong
Chinese Communist Party politicians from Shandong